Charlotte Colbert is a Franco-British film director and a moving image and multi-media artist.

Early life 

Born on the 30th of May 1987, she is one of the eight children of James Goldsmith the businessman who died in 1997. Her mother is the French journalist Laure Boulay de la Meurthe, with whom Goldsmith openly had a long-term relationship while married to Annabel Goldsmith – making Colbert a half-sibling of Jemima Goldsmith.

Art

Photography 

Colbert's work has been likened to that of Toomer, Breton and Dalí and described as an “exploration into the human mind”.

Her solo show A Day At Home was described by The Huffington Post as "a surreal meditation on domesticity and self-destruction".

Colbert has been exhibited internationally, including Hong Kong Basel, Istanbul Art Fair, and Photo-London.

Multi-media sculpture 

Colbert's multi-media sculptures are made of layered TV screens encased in rusty metal. The Benefit Supervisor Sleeping is a 170 kg video installation, 21st-century reinterpretation of Lucian Freud's famous painting of Sue Tilley. It is described as inverting the male gaze and "re-frame Sue Tilley, the subject of Freud's Benefit Supervisor series, from objectified to objectifier.

Film 

Colbert studied at the London Film School. She is the co-author of feature film Leave to Remain about underage asylum seekers in Britain with a score by Mercury Prize-winning band Alt-J. It won awards at the BUFF Film Festival and the Bergamo International Film Festival.

In 2016, she wrote and directed The Silent Man, described in ID as "the most surreal shorts you'll ever see" with Simon Amstell and Sophie Kennedy-Clark, Ben Miller and a cameo by Cillian Murphy. She made two animated shorts The Girl With Liquid Eyes with Maryam d'Abo and The Man With the Stolen Heart with Bill Nighy.

She is a producer on Dali Land directed by Mary Harron (American Psycho), co-produced with Pressman Films. It is a biopic about artist Salvador Dalí starring Sir Ben Kingsley, Ezra Miller, Andreja Peijic, Suki Waterhouse. 

Colbert directed and co-wrote She Will with Alice Krige, Kota Eberhart, Malcolm McDowell, Rupert Everett produced by Dario Argento and Pressman Films with an original score by Clint Mansell. The BIFA nominated film won the Golden Leopard for the first film at the Locarno Film Festival. It has been described as “A Superb, Sly Horror-Drama Debut Delivering Otherworldly Feminist Vengeance” by Jessica Kiang in Variety and Alfonso Cuarón has said that “it sits in the tradition of great psychological horror films [which] leaves one questioning long after [it] is finished”.

Colbert is the co-founder of Popcorn Group a production company known for the viral sensation short Leading Lady Parts (with Emilia Clark, Florence Pugh and Gemma Chan), co-producing Fleabag in the WestEnd and co-producing Alice Lowe's time travelling romcom TimeStalker with the BFI.

Colbert set up the Popcorn Writing Award in Edinburgh which is run with the BBC and gives a prize to a writer at the Edinburgh Festival Fringe every year. Past committee members have included Fatima Bhutto, Aurora, Jonny Woo, Lena Headey, Enda Walsh.

Colbert also set up the NFTS x Popcorn Writing Award which allocates a prize to the most original script from NFTS film school screenwriting graduates.

Publishing 

Colbert was one of the publishers of The Artists Colouring Book of ABCs done in support of the Kids Company, featuring works by Grayson Perry, Alex Katz, and Tracey Emin.

Philanthropy 

Colbert is on the board of the Isla Foundation and the Ecology Trust.

See also 

Nam June Paik
Jean Toomer
Renate Bertlmann

References 

1987
Living people
British filmmakers
British women artists
British multimedia artists
Alumni of the London Film School
1987 births